Zamora Club de Fútbol is a Spanish football team based in Zamora, in the autonomous community of Castile and León. Founded in 1968 it plays in Segunda División RFEF – Group 1, holding home games at Estadio Ruta de la Plata, with a capacity of 7,813 seaters.

History 
Zamora CF was founded on October 23, 1968. But officially the act number 1 of the club is dated November 7, 1968, when the club was registered in the Western Federation in Valladolid. The club started in the Primera Regional in 1969. In the 1970-71 season it became its champion and promoted to Tercera División.

Season to season

1 season in Primera División RFEF
25 seasons in Segunda División B
1 season in Segunda División RFEF
24 seasons in Tercera División
3 seasons in Categorías Regionales

Honours
Tercera División: 1977–78, 1992–93, 1998–99, 2015–16, 2018–19, 2019–20

Players

Current squad

Out on loan

Former players

References

External links
Official website 
Futbolme team profile 

Zamora CF
Sport in Zamora, Spain
Football clubs in Castile and León
Association football clubs established in 1969
1969 establishments in Spain
Primera Federación clubs